It is estimated that Protestantism is practised by 61,358 or roughly 3% of the total population.

History of Protestantism in North Macedonia
In the late 19th and early 20th century many American missionaries working from Salonika converted a number of villages in the Strumica-Petrich region to Methodism. These villages still retain the Methodist faith to this day. Another significant sect of Protestantism in North Macedonia is the Baptist faith. Baptist work existed in North Macedonia as early as 1928. The Union of Baptist Christians was organized in 1991. It is a member of the European Baptist Federation and the Baptist World Alliance. It is estimated that Protestantism is practised by 61,358 or roughly 3% of the total population.

Many Methodists emigrated in the 1960s and 1970s. A number of these came to Australia. There is a Macedonian parish of the Uniting Church operating in Wood Street, East Preston. There is also a Macedonian Baptist community in Regent.

Notable Protestant Macedonians 
 Boris Trajkovski - former President of North Macedonia

References

 
North Macedonia